Pelab Kabi (1935/1936 – 3 January 2020) was an Indian politician from West Bengal belonging to Communist Party of India. He was a legislator of the West Bengal Legislative Assembly.

Biography
Kabi was elected as a member of the West Bengal legislative assembly from  Jamuria in 1996. He was also elected from Jamuria in 2001.

References

Year of birth missing
1930s births
2020 deaths
Communist Party of India (Marxist) politicians from West Bengal
People from Paschim Bardhaman district
West Bengal MLAs 1996–2001
West Bengal MLAs 2001–2006